San Juan or Upper Camp is a ghost town that was a mining camp of the Eldorado Mining District. It was located in the upper reach of El Dorado Canyon, just below the present day location of Nelson in Clark County, Nevada.

History
After silver was discovered in 1862 in the upper San Juan creek, a mining camp was established. The silver ore was transported by steamboats of the Colorado River
It was determined that the small veins could not be mined for a profit, and San Juan was abandoned weeks later. A large stone building are the only remains from the settlement.

References

Ghost towns in Clark County, Nevada
Mining communities in Nevada
Nevada Territory
Steamboats of the Colorado River
Ghost towns in Nevada
Populated places established in 1861
1861 establishments in Nevada Territory